Antonio Rocca (mid 17th century) was an Italian painter. He became a monk and worked in Rome and the Piedmont. He died at Rome about 1660.

References

17th-century Italian painters
Italian male painters
Italian Baroque painters
Painters from Piedmont
Year of death unknown
Year of birth unknown